The Old Mission Peninsula AVA is an American Viticultural Area located in Grand Traverse County, Michigan known for well-regarded Michigan wine. The Old Mission Peninsula extends northward from Traverse City into the Grand Traverse Bay of Lake Michigan, ending at Old Mission Point. The climate on the peninsula is moderated by the surrounding waters, helping to prevent frost during the growing season. Grape varietals suitable to cool climates, such as Riesling, Chardonnay, Gewürztraminer, Pinot gris, Pinot noir, Cabernet Franc, and Merlot do best in the Old Mission Peninsula AVA.

The peninsula has extensive cherry orchards and vineyards.  There are ten wineries offering tasting rooms, each located within five miles of each other. Of Traverse City’s two wine-growing peninsulas, Old Mission is smaller and more easily encompassed in a single day: just a little under 20 miles from end to end, and in places as little as three miles wide. The hardiness zones are 5b and 6a.

History

The Old Mission Peninsula was settled in 1842 by a Presbyterian minister. During the Civil War period, the area saw an influx in population with many families today able to trace their ties to the area back to this period. Located along the 45th parallel north, and moderated by Lake Michigan and the deep Grand Traverse Bay, the region soon showed that it had macroclimate to produce a wide range of fruits and vegetables. Early agriculture in the area subsisted on apples, cherries and potatoes. In 1870, George Parmalee, of the Michigan State Horticultural Society, encouraged farmers of Old Mission Peninsula to branch out to different plantings but it would be another 100 years before wine grape varieties really took hold in the area.

In 1974 Edward O'Keefe Jr. of Chateau Grand Traverse began planting Vitis vinifera varieties including Chardonnay, Pinot noir and Riesling near Traverse City. The following year he expanded to 55-acre of grapevines, which was the first large-scale planting of Vitis vinifera.. (However, it wasn't the very first commercial planting of vinifera since Tabor Hill Winery of Berrien County, had planted a few experimental acres of vinifera grapevines in southwest Michigan in 1969.)

In the 1980s, the Michigan wine industry saw growth throughout the state as several American Viticultural Areas, including Fennville, Lake Michigan Shore and the nearby Leelanau Peninsula, were approved. The Old Mission Peninsula received its AVA designation on June 8, 1987. The leading force behind AVA recognition came from Edward O'Keefe, whose Chateau Grand Traverse was the peninsula’s only commercial winery at the time. Today the wine industry in the Old Mission Peninsula has expanded to include eight wineries and a thriving wine tourism industry.

Grape varieties and wine styles
Currently the wineries of the Old Mission Peninsula are focused on the production of Vinifera wines with an average of 90,000 cases produced in the AVA on a yearly basis. Among the grape varieties planted in the peninsula are Cabernet Franc, Cabernet Sauvignon, Chardonnay, Gamay noir, Gewurztraminer, Malbec, Merlot, Muscat Ottonel, Pinot blanc, Pinot gris, Pinot noir, Riesling.

Wineries in Old Mission Peninsula AVA
There are eleven wineries in the Old Mission Peninsula AVA. The Old Mission Peninsula American Viticultural Area sits close to the 45th parallel, a longitude known for growing prestigious grapes. The wineries in the Old Mission Peninsula American Viticultural Area are 2 Lads Winery, Bonobo Winery, Black Star Farms, Bowers Harbor Vineyards, Brys Estate Vineyard & Winery, Chateau Chantal, Chateau Grand Traverse, Hawthorne Vineyards, Left Foot Charley (with vineyards in OMP, winery in Traverse City), Mari Vineyards, Peninsula Cellars, and Tabone Vineyards.

References

External links
Traverse City’s Wine Trail 

American Viticultural Areas
Geography of Grand Traverse County, Michigan
Michigan wine
1987 establishments in Michigan